The 1973–74 Clarks Men's Shoes National Basketball League season was the second season of the newly formulated National Basketball League.

The league and cup was sponsored by Clarks Men's Shoes and the number of teams increased to eight. The Avenue club moved from Leyton to Edmonton and the Sutton club merged with Crystal Palace. Four new teams appeared in the form of the Doncaster Panthers, the Manchester Giants and two more London based teams the Islington & London Latvian Embassy All-Stars and the London YMCA Metros.

The Sutton & Crystal Palace team completed the double of National League and Cup beginning what would soon be a dynasty for the Crystal Palace team. There were no playoffs for the League during this era and an American called Jim Guymon was the season MVP.

League standings

National Cup Final

Leading scorers

References

See also
Basketball in England
British Basketball League
English Basketball League
List of English National Basketball League seasons

British
British